Veselie Glacier is the 7 km long and 2.5 km wide glacier in Austa Ridge on Oscar II Coast in Graham Land situated southeast of Jorum Glacier and northeast of Chernoochene Glacier.  It flows east-southeastwards along the north slopes of Mount Birks to enter Spillane Fjord west-southwest of Caution Point.  The feature is named after the settlement of Veselie in Southeastern Bulgaria.

Location
British mapping in 1976.

Maps
 British Antarctic Territory.  Scale 1:200000 topographic map.  DOS 610 Series, Sheet W 65 62.  Directorate of Overseas Surveys, Tolworth, UK, 1976.
 Antarctic Digital Database (ADD). Scale 1:250000 topographic map of Antarctica. Scientific Committee on Antarctic Research (SCAR). Since 1993, regularly upgraded and updated.

References
 Veselie Glacier. SCAR Composite Antarctic Gazetteer.
 Bulgarian Antarctic Gazetteer. Antarctic Place-names Commission. (details in Bulgarian, basic data in English)

External links
 Humar Glacier. Copernix satellite image

Glaciers of Oscar II Coast
Bulgaria and the Antarctic